The Mischief Maker is a 1916 American silent comedy-drama film directed by John G. Adolfi and starring June Caprice, Harry Benham and John Reinhardt.

Cast
 June Caprice as Effie Marchand 
 Harry Benham as Al Tourney 
 John Reinhardt as Jules Gerard 
 Margaret Fielding as May Muprey 
 Inez Ranous as Madame Briand
 Minnie Milne as Effie's Sister 
 Tom Brooke as Henry Tourney 
 Nellie Slattery as Mrs. Marchand

References

Bibliography
 Solomon, Aubrey. The Fox Film Corporation, 1915-1935: A History and Filmography. McFarland, 2011.

External links

1916 films
1916 comedy-drama films
Films directed by John G. Adolfi
American silent feature films
American black-and-white films
Fox Film films
1910s English-language films
1910s American films
Silent American comedy-drama films